This list exhibits the National Basketball Association's top rookie single-season rebounding averages based on at least 70 games played or 800 rebounds. The NBA did not record rebounds until the 1950–51 season.

External links
Basketball-Reference.com

See also
National Basketball Association

National Basketball Association top rookie rebounding averages
National Basketball Association statistical leaders